The Exchange Bank Building is a historic commercial building at 423 Main Street in Little Rock, Arkansas.  It is a five-story masonry structure, built in 1921 out of reinforced concrete, brick, limestone, and granite.  It has Classical Revival, with its main facade dominated by massive engaged fluted Doric columns.  It was designed by the noted Arkansas architectural firm of Thompson & Harding, and is considered one of its best commercial designs.

The building was listed on the National Register of Historic Places in 1986.

See also
National Register of Historic Places listings in Little Rock, Arkansas

References

Bank buildings on the National Register of Historic Places in Arkansas
Neoclassical architecture in Arkansas
Buildings and structures in Little Rock, Arkansas
National Register of Historic Places in Little Rock, Arkansas
Office buildings completed in 1921